The First Congregational Church is a historic church at 400 Main Street in Farmington, New Hampshire.  Built in 1875 for a congregation founded in 1819, it is the oldest church building in the town, and a distinctive example of Gothic Revival architecture designed by New Hampshire native Frederick N. Footman.  The church was added to the National Register of Historic Places in 2018, and the New Hampshire State Register of Historic Places in 2017. The congregation is affiliated with the United Church of Christ.

Description and history
The First Congregational Church stands in the town center of Farmington, on the west side of Main Street (New Hampshire Route 153) at Pleasant Street.  It is a red brick building, with a basically rectangular plan covered by a gabled roof.  A square tower projects from the left front corner, rising  and housing a clock and belfry before terminating in a steeple surmounted by a cross.  The bell was dedicated in 1918 to the memory of politician Henry Wilson, who was a member of the congregation in his youth.  The interior retains a number of original features, including chair rails, Gothic choir pews, and massive wooden roof trusses.  It has a series of particularly fine stained glass windows that are original to its construction.

The church was built in 1875 to a design to Frederick Footman.  Footman was a native of Somersworth, who was one of the first enrollees in the architecture program of the Massachusetts Institute of Technology.  The congregation was founded in 1819, and built its first dedicated sanctuary across the street in 1844.  That building burned during a blizzard in 1875, and the present building was constructed on land donated by a wealthy local businessman.

See also
National Register of Historic Places listings in Strafford County, New Hampshire

References

External links
Church website

United Church of Christ churches in New Hampshire
Congregational churches in New Hampshire
Churches on the National Register of Historic Places in New Hampshire
Gothic Revival architecture in New Hampshire
Churches completed in 1875
19th-century churches in the United States
Churches in Strafford County, New Hampshire
National Register of Historic Places in Strafford County, New Hampshire
New Hampshire State Register of Historic Places
Farmington, New Hampshire